Elly Idris (born 4 November 1962) is a former Indonesian international footballer who is currently the coach of Indonesian Super League side Persita Tangerang.

References
BOLA No. 2.233, 8-10 Agustus 2011

1962 births
Living people
Indonesian footballers
Association footballers not categorized by position
Indonesian football managers